The Haitian Coast Guard, officially the Haitian Coast Guard Commission (French: Commissariat des Gardes-Côtes d’Haïti) or G-Cd'H, is an operational unit of the Haitian National Police. It is one of the few law enforcement organisations in the world to combine water policing and coast guard duties while remaining as a policing unit. It operates primarily as a law enforcement agency, with secondary responsibilities in search and rescue.

History
The Haitian Coast Guard was formed in the late 1930s, 20 years after the disbandment of the Haitian Navy, and was equipped with two small picket boats named 1 and 2 and the 161-ton Sans Souci. The latter was formerly the American yacht Captain James Taylor.

During World War II, six 83-foot cutters, named 1 through 6, were transferred from the US Coast Guard in 1942. Three 121-ton SC class submarine chasers, Touissaint L'Ouverture, 16 Aout 1946, and Admiral Killick, were transferred in 1947, along with the 47-ton cutter Savannah and the light transport Vertières. The two picket boats were withdrawn at this time.

In 1948, a US Naval Mission arrived in Haiti.

The transport Vertières sank in 1951 and was replaced by the Artibonite, a LCT which had been previously wrecked on the Haitian coast and was subsequently salvaged.

The Coast Guard remained this way until the Admiral Killick was stricken in 1954 and was replaced by a US-sourced buoy tender given the same name in 1955. In 1956 a new 100 ton coast cutter, La Crête-à-Pierrot, was acquired from the United States. The two remaining sub-chasers were stricken in 1960 which is when the new Vertières, sister to the La Crête-à-Pierrot, was acquired. The US Navy netlayer , renamed Jean-Jacques Dessalines, arrived in 1960 for a five-year, extended to 17-year lease.
On April 21, 1970, three units — La Crête-à-Pierrot, Vertières, and Jean-Jacques Dessalines — mutinied and shelled the Presidential Palace in Port-au-Prince. They were driven off by fighter aircraft and then interred themselves in the Guantanamo Bay Naval Base. The US disarmed the vessels and relocated them initially to Puerto Rico and then back to Haiti. Duvalier celebrated this event by renaming the Coast Guard the "Haitian Navy" (La Marine Haitienne).

In 1973, Duvalier attempted to expand this with the purchase of up to 24 small boats, allegedly to include PT boats, but these plans came to naught.

In 1976, the Haitian Navy purchased five small patrol craft from Sewart Seacraft of Berwick, Louisiana. The Dessalines was returned to the United States, while the Admiral Killick, Artibonite and the Savannah and the six 83-foot cutters were stricken.

The planned sale of a sister ship fell through.

The Coast Guard in the late 1980s consisted of only the armed tug Henri Christophe, nine small patrol craft built in the United States between 1976 and 1981, and the old presidential yacht Sans Souci. This small force was composed of 45 officers and 280 enlisted personnel based at Port-au-Prince.

When the Haitian Armed Forces were disbanded in the 1990s, the remnants of the Haitian Navy was renamed the Coast Guard and was transferred to the National Police.

Current Coast Guard
The marine police is exercised by a specialized unit of the National Police called the Corps des Gardes-Côtes  or Coast Guard. This unit was created July 16, 1996 and is based Bizoton.

Role and mission

The core mission of the Coast Guard is to secure the maritime area of Haiti through surveillance of territorial waters and the safety of maritime navigation divided into these different functions:

 Perform active surveillance of the national maritime areas;
 Ensuring compliance with laws and regulations regarding fishing and navigation;
 Participate in the fight against drug trafficking;
 Participate in the fight against all forms of crime.

Structure

The Coast Guard consists of a command post (CP) include: Commandant of the Coast Guard, an Assistant Commandant, an Operations Manager and Head of the Administration and three basic units:

Bases
 Killick, the base of Port-au-Prince
 equipped with: 6 vedettes and 4 patrol boats.
   The base of Cap-Haïtien
 equipped with: 4 vedettes and 2 patrol boats.
   The base of Jacmel
 equipped with: 2 vedettes and 1 patrol boat.

Ship types
 12 Vedette: 40 foot boat - ex-Haitian naval cruisers c.1980s
 Patrouilleur: 32-foot patrol boat called GO FAST for fast response.

Identification
Haitian Coast Guard vessels are marked with a diagonal blue before red slash and before the words Gardes-Côtes. Coast Guard vessels are painted all-white.

Fleet
Haitian Coast Guard will purchase 4 unit 47-foot Motor Lifeboats and 4 unit Eurocopter MH-65 Dolphins from US Coast Guard.

References

External links
 Official Coast Guard page 
 Official National Police page
 Canadian Embassy article

Coast guards
National Police
Government agencies established in 1995
1995 establishments in Haiti